The Wyoming United States House election for 1896 was held on November 3, 1896. Democratic John Eugene Osborne defeated Republican incumbent Frank Wheeler Mondell with 49.14% of the vote making Mondell the third incumbent Representative from Wyoming to lose reelection and was the third time in a row that the incumbent had lost. It was the first time that the House election was won with only a plurality of the votes.

Results

References

1896
Wyoming
1896 Wyoming elections